The 751st Bombardment Squadron is a former United States Army Air Forces unit.  The squadron was first activated in July 1943.  After training in the United States, it deployed to the European Theater of Operations, where it participated in the strategic bombing campaign against Germany.   Following V-E Day, the squadron returned to the United States and was inactivated in August 1945.

History

Training in the United States
The 751st Bombardment Squadron was activated at Geiger Field, Washington on 1 July 1943 as one of the four squadrons of the 457th Bombardment Group.  It moved a week later to Rapid City Army Air Base, South Dakota, where it began training with the Boeing B-17 Flying Fortress heavy bomber and engaged in the first two phases of training there.  It completed its training at Ephrata Army Air Base, Washington, then moved to Wendover Field, Utah for final preparation for overseas movement.  It departed for the European Theater of Operations on New Years Day, 1944.

Combat in Europe
The squadron assembled at its combat station, RAF Glatton, by the end of the month.  The air echelon had begun arriving at Glatton on 21 January.  The squadron flew its first mission during Big Week on 21 February 1944.  It engaged primarily in the strategic bombing campaign against Germany, attacking ball bearing plants, oil refineries and aircraft factories until June 1944. In July 1944, the squadron returned to strategic targets, which remained its primary objectives through April 1945.  On 2 November 1944, a two group formation including the squadron strayed from the main bomber stream and its fighter cover.  Luftwaffe fighter controllers directed a geschwader of interceptors against the formation.  Nine of the 457th Group's Flying Fortresses were lost to this attack.

In June 1944, the squadron was diverted from its strategic mission to prepare for Operation Overlord, the invasion of France.  On D Day, it attacked coastal defenses on the Cherbourg Peninsula.  For the remainder of the month it was engaged in air interdiction, striking airfields, rail systems and roads and depots behind enemy lines.  The squadron was also diverted to tactical targets for shorter periods.  In July 1944, it supported Operation Cobra, the breakout of ground forces at Saint Lo.  During Operation Market Garden, the attempt to secure bridgeheads across the Rhine River in the Netherlands, it supported the British 1st Airborne Division.  It provided similar support during the Battle of the Bulge in December 1944 and January 1945, and Operation Varsity, the airborne assault across the Rhine in March 1945.

The squadron flew its last combat mission on 20 April 1945. Following V-E Day, it transported prisoners of war from Austria to France. It assembled at Sioux Falls Army Air Field, South Dakota in late July. It was inactivated there the following month.

Lineage
 Constituted as the 751st Bombardment Squadron (Heavy) on 19 May 1943
 Activated on 1 July 1943
 Redesignated 751st Bombardment Squadron, Heavy in 1944 
 Inactivated on 28 August 1945

Assignments
 457th Bombardment Group, 1 July 1943 – 28 August 1945

Stations
 Geiger Field, Washington, 1 July 1943
 Rapid City Army Air Base, South Dakota, 9 July 1943
 Ephrata Army Air Base, Washington, 28 October 1943
 Wendover Field, Utah, 6 December 1943 – 1 January 1944
 RAF Glatton, (Station 130) England, 28 January 1944 – c. 1 June 1945
 Sioux Falls Army Air Field, South Dakota, c. 20 July–28 August 1945

Aircraft
 Boeing B-17 Flying Fortress, 1943–1945

Campaigns

See also

 B-17 Flying Fortress units of the United States Army Air Forces

References

Notes

Bibliography

 
 
 
 

Bombardment squadrons of the United States Army Air Forces
Military units and formations established in 1943
World War II strategic bombing units